Berntzen is a surname. Notable people with the surname include:

Einar Berntzen (born 1955), Norwegian political scientist
Julian Berntzen (born 1981), Norwegian vocalist, pianist, violinist, and composer
Rolf Berntzen (1918–2005), Norwegian actor, grandfather of Julian

See also
Berntsen